David F. Douglass served in the California legislature and as Secretary of State.  During the Mexican–American War he served in the US Army.

References

American military personnel of the Mexican–American War
Members of the California State Legislature
Secretaries of State of California
19th-century American politicians
Year of birth missing
Year of death missing